The Church of the Blessed Virgin Mary is a church in Staré, Slovakia.

The parish was established in the 13th century. The first written account is from 1332-37. In 1335, the village consisted of Horné Staré and Kostolné Staré with St. Anne church. It was later devoted to the translation of the Virgin Mary, Saint Anne and Saint Stanislav, who was bishop and martyr. This church had a choir, a sacristy and a tower with two bells. The parish lapsed in the late 17th century and was renewed in 1721.

The current building was built between 1811 and 1842 in the classical style. While the new church was being constructed services were held in part of the lord's granary.

This monumental church dominates its surroundings and is characterised by its beautiful architecture and interior. It is a single-aisle building with segmental closure of the presbytery. The ground plan is longitudinal. The sanctuary is a gently curved five-flanks closure to which adjoin two aisle sacristies. The main face of the building attaches a tower and is divided to four pilasters. On the top is a massive cross. In the middle of its frontal face is the main portal „DEO UNI ET TRINO” which means „To triunity God”. On either side of the main gate in masonry are large sculptures of Saints Cyril and Methodius.

The window-panes are of St. Dominic Sávio and St. Maria Goretti, St. Peter and St. Paul, St. Monica and St. Susanna on the left and St. John the Baptist and St. Joseph, St. Cyril and St. Methodius, St. Michael on the right.

References

Churches completed in 1842
19th-century churches in Slovakia
Churches in Košice Region